Gilbert Gauthe is an American former Catholic priest who served in the Diocese of Lafayette in Louisiana from 1972 to 1983. In 1984, Gauthe became the first Catholic priest in the United States to face a widely publicized criminal trial for child sexual abuse.

Gauthe admitted to abusing 37 children and accepted a plea bargain for which he was sentenced to 20 years in prison. He was released in 1995 after serving 10 years of his sentence, then moved to Texas where he was charged with abusing a 3-year-old boy. He received probation in 1997 after pleading guilty to injuring the child and was later jailed in Galveston County between 2008 and 2010 for violating the Texas sex registry requirements.

References

Further reading
"Church abuse case haunts lawyer who defended priest", USA Today (2013)

Catholic priests convicted of child sexual abuse
American priests
American people convicted of child sexual abuse
1945 births
Living people